Felix L. Cory was a teacher and state legislator in Mississippi. He represented Adams County, Mississippi in the Mississippi House of Representatives from 1884 to 1886. Chas. D. Foules served with him from the county.

See also
 African-American officeholders during and following the Reconstruction era

References

Year of birth missing
Schoolteachers from Mississippi
African-American state legislators in Mississippi
Members of the Mississippi House of Representatives
People from Adams County, Mississippi
African-American politicians during the Reconstruction Era
African-American schoolteachers
19th-century American educators
Year of death missing